Grivitsa Airfield is a public use airfield located 1 nm east of Grivitsa, Pleven, Bulgaria.

See also
List of airports in Bulgaria

References

External links 
 Airport record for Grivitsa Airport at Landings.com

Airports in Bulgaria
Pleven Province